The Balfrin is a mountain of the Swiss Pennine Alps, located north of the Dom in the canton of Valais. It belongs to the Mischabel massif, which lies between the Mattertal and the Saastal.

The northern side of the Balfrin is covered by a glacier named Balfringletscher. On the south side is the larger Ried Glacier.

References

External links

 The Balfrin on Hikr
 The Balfrin on Summitpost
 The Balfrin on Mount Wiki

Mountains of the Alps
Alpine three-thousanders
Mountains of Valais
Mountains of Switzerland